Budimir Vujačić (born 4 January 1964) is a Montenegrin former professional footballer. Mainly a left-back, he could also operate as a centre-back.

Club career
Born in Titograd, Montenegro, Socialist Federal Republic of Yugoslavia, Vujačić grew up in Petrovac na Moru, and began his football career with local outfit OFK Petrovac. In 1985, aged 21, he moved abroad, playing three solid seasons for SC Freiburg in the 2. Bundesliga.

In January 1988, Vujačić returned home and signed with FK Vojvodina. He was a member of the team that won the Yugoslav First League in 1989. In June 1989. he joined FK Partizan. At the Belgrade outfit, he was an everpresent defensive figure (also contributing with ten league goals during his spell), as the team won one cup and the first edition of the championship after the creation of Serbia and Montenegro, with Partizan leading second-placed neighbours Red Star by 14 points, whilst only conceding 20 goals in 36 matches.

Vujačić then joined Sporting CP, winning the Portuguese Cup in the only season in which he was a regular starter (29 matches, two goals). He retired from football in 1998 at the age of 34, after a short spell in Japan with Vissel Kobe.

International career
Vujačić made his senior national team debut for SFR Yugoslavia on 27 May 1989, in a friendly match against Belgium (1–0 loss in Brussels) – he played the entire second half. He was later included to UEFA Euro 1992, but the nation would be suspended due to the Yugoslav Wars. In total, he gained a total of 12 caps (eight plus four for the newly created FR Yugoslavia), but did not attend any major international tournament. His final international was a December 1996 friendly match away against Argentina.

Post-playing career
Following his retirement, Vujačić served as scout for Manchester United, and was responsible for bringing Zoran Tošić and Adem Ljajić to the club's attention.

Career statistics

Club

International

References

External links

National team data

1964 births
Living people
Footballers from Podgorica
Association football defenders
Yugoslav footballers
Yugoslavia international footballers
Serbia and Montenegro footballers
Serbia and Montenegro international footballers
Montenegrin footballers
OFK Petrovac players
FK Obilić players
SC Freiburg players
FK Vojvodina players
FK Partizan players
Sporting CP footballers
Vissel Kobe players
2. Bundesliga players
Yugoslav First League players
First League of Serbia and Montenegro players
Primeira Liga players
J1 League players
Yugoslav expatriate footballers
Expatriate footballers in Germany
Yugoslav expatriate sportspeople in Germany
Serbia and Montenegro expatriate footballers
Expatriate footballers in Portugal
Expatriate footballers in Japan
Serbia and Montenegro expatriate sportspeople in Japan
Manchester United F.C. non-playing staff
Montenegrin expatriate sportspeople in Portugal